Americana is a 2008 album by Canadian singer Roch Voisine. Many of the tracks were recorded in Nashville, Tennessee.

He followed that in 2009 with the album AmerIIcana.

Track listing
Bonus bilingual English / French version tracks marked with [*]
"City of New Orleans"  
"Ring of Fire" 
"Let It Be Me"  
"Lay Lady Lay"
"Crazy"  
"Suspicious Minds" 
"You Never Can Tell" 
"And I Love You So" 
"Always on My Mind"
"Ode to Billy Joe" 
"I Will Always Love You"
"City of New Orleans" / Salut les amoureux [*]  
"Let It Be Me" / Je t'appartiens [*]  
"Ode to Billy Joe" / La Marie-Jeanne [*]

Charts

Weekly charts

Year-end charts

See also
Americana II
Americana III

External links
Roch Voisine Official site album page

References

2008 albums
Roch Voisine albums
Covers albums